Themsie Times (22 September 1949 – 9 December 2021), sometimes credited as Temsie Times or Themsie Times, was a South African film and television actress.

Early life
She was born in Port Elizabeth, Cape Province in what was then the Union of South Africa, the youngest of seven siblings.

Career
Times's screen work included appearances in three films and she also appeared as Maria Zibula in 7de Laan, a television soap opera, being one of the show's regular characters.

Filmography

Personal life
In September 2008, she was living and working in Johannesburg, Gauteng, South Africa.

Times died on 9 December 2021, at the age of 72.

Notes

External links

1949 births
2021 deaths
People from Johannesburg
People from Port Elizabeth
South African film actresses
South African television actresses